The lac à l'Épaule (English: shoulder lake) is a freshwater body crossed from north to south by the Rivière à l'Épaule, in Jacques-Cartier National Park. This lake is located entirely in the unorganized territory of Lac-Jacques-Cartier, in the La Côte-de-Beaupré Regional County Municipality, administrative region of Capitale-Nationale, in province of Quebec, in Canada.

A secondary road serves the western part of the lake for forestry and recreational tourism activities.

Forestry is the main economic activity in the sector; recreotourism activities, second in particular through the "Camp Devin" which is now administered by the Société des établissements de plein air du Québec.

The surface of Lac à l'Épaule is generally frozen from the beginning of December to the end of March; safe circulation on the ice is generally done from the end of December to the beginning of March.

Geography 
The "Petit lac à l'Épaule" is the source of the rivière à l'Épaule, the current of which crosses southward to "Lac à l'Épaule" over its full length. The second main source of Lac à l'Épaule is the discharge of the "lac à Noël" (English: lake at Christmas) (coming from the southeast).

This lake deep between the mountains is long, with a small bay on the east bank. A dam was built a few decades ago at the exit of the largest of these lakes.

From the mouth of Lac à l'Épaule, the current of the rivière à l'Épaule goes down on  towards the southwest to Jacques-Cartier River where it flows at the foot of the Épaule mountain. Then the current descends on  generally towards the south by borrowing the current from the Jacques-Cartier River to the northeast bank of the Saint-Laurent river.

Toponymy 
The origin of this toponym is very old. Its meaning remains uncertain, however the main hypothesis considered describes that the shoulder (shoulder) could here designate a flat with a fairly gentle slope used to connect two valleys whose level differs. The phenomenon is common in regions that have experienced glaciations.

A report dated 1829 and signed by the surveyor John Adams mentions the "rivière à L'Épaule" and the "Montagne de l'Épaule", while William Ware describes the surroundings of Lac à l'Épaule in 1835. This area was frequented in the 17th century by Jesuits who went, by a path traced by the Innu, to lac Saint-Jean. The plan of the Wendat (Huron) chief Nicholas Vincent, drawn up around 1829, identifies the river under its Wendat name "Hüaonjacaronté".

This sector, on the outskirts of the settlers' settlements, has undergone some attempts to clear it, because abattis were spotted there in 1867. The government then built a shelter there for travelers from Lac-Saint-Jean. Later, a road to Jacques-Cartier Lake. Beginning in 1907, sport fishermen were in turn served by accommodation facilities, to which was later added Camp Devlin. Lac à l'Épaule hosted, in the summer of 1943, Sir Winston Churchill and Franklin Delano Roosevelt, gathered in Quebec for an Allied conference. A larger pavilion, erected by a logging company in 1946, later became a meeting place reserved for government officials. A landmark event in contemporary history took place there in September 1962 and made the expression make, hold a shoulder-to-shoulder famous. A special council of ministers of the Quebec government was there, in fact, to decide to call a referendum election on the theme "Give Hydro-Quebec the mandate to unify and integrate Quebec hydroelectric resources".

The toponym lac à l'Épaule was formalized on December 5, 1968, by the Commission de toponymie du Québec.

Notes and references

See also 
 Jacques-Cartier National Park
 La Côte-de-Beaupré Regional County Municipality (MRC)
 Lac-Jacques-Cartier, an unorganized territory
 Rivière à l'Épaule
 Jacques-Cartier River
 List of lakes of Canada

Lakes of Capitale-Nationale
La Côte-de-Beaupré Regional County Municipality